, or , is a Japanese manga collective composed of short stories written and illustrated by Rumiko Takahashi. New stories are published annually in Shogakukan's Big Comic Original magazine (and other Shogakukan magazines) since 1987.

A 13-episode anime adaptation of these short stories was produced by TMS Entertainment and broadcast on TV Tokyo from July to September 2003, followed by the sequel series Rumic Theater: Mermaid Forest, adapting Takahashi's Mermaid Saga. A 2-episode Japanese television drama based on the stories was broadcast on NHK-BS Premium in July 2012.

Media

Manga
The Rumic Theater are manga short stories published periodically by Rumiko Takahashi Shogakukan's Big Comic Original and other Shogakukan magazines since 1987. An English language collection by Viz Media was released in two volumes on June 5, 1996 and June 5, 1998, the first corresponding to the volume The Tragedy of P, but the second being a release of Rumic Worlds One or Double collection.

Volume list

Anime
In June 2003, the July issue of Animage announced that an anime adaptation of Rumic Theater produced by TMS Entertainment and directed by Akira Nishimori would premiere on TV Tokyo on July 5, 2003. The series ran for 13 episodes until September 27, 2003.

In North America, Geneon Entertainment licensed the series for English language release. They released the series on four DVDs from January 11 to July 19, 2005.

Episode list
Episode 1
 – Summary: It follows the struggle of Mrs. Haga to keep her guest, Pitto the penguin, out of sight from Mrs. Kakei, the resident tattletale who will report the bird's violation of the pet free apartment building.
Characters

Mr. Haga

Episode 2
 – Summary: A wedding chapel that has fallen on hard times struggles to stay in business while its young owner deals with her recent divorce and the burden of keeping her friends employed.
Characters

Old gentlewoman

Old gentleman

Auntie

Pops

Episode 3
 – Summary: A tough, business-minded father loses his memory and believes he is a teenager. He meets a young school girl and cannot help but become smitten with her.
Characters

Episode 4
 – Summary: Mrs. Asakawa suspects her neighbor of beating her elderly mother-in-law being responsible for the death of her husband. The mystery unfolds when Mrs. Asakawa makes a shocking discovery hidden inside a potted plant.
Characters

Tonegawa Mother

Tonegawa Husband

Yukie's Husband

Episode 5
 – Summary: Hazuki's family is virtually in the poorhouse. Therefore, she is shocked when her father decides to go on an expensive family vacation. Soon she suspects that her father's motives may involve a suicide pact for her and her family.
Characters

Hazuki's Father

Hazuki's Mother

Aisaki's Girlfriend

Neighbor

Doctor

Episode 6
 – Summary: When Mr. Domoto is laid off of his prestigious job as a salaryman, his wife falls ill and asks him to fill in for her at the convenience store. There, his rough personality doesn't mesh well with his co-workers, but he learns from a hard-working foreigner named Achara to persevere.Note: Narration by Ichiro Nagai
Characters

Episode 7
 – Summary: Risa Hoshino comes back from the dead with amazing telekinetic powers. The old woman develops a crush on another patient and believes him to be the reincarnation of her jilted lover from decades ago.
Characters

Episode 8
 – Summary: Mrs. Kobato finds herself in the middle of a battle between the stuck-up Mrs. Shiratori and the elderly Mrs. Ukai, who eventually bring a crab and a bird into the argument.
Characters

Kobato's Son

Episode 9
 – Summary: A middle-aged man loses his wife, yet his wife's soul is bothered by the fact that he does not cry at her funeral. Her spirit soon returns to haunt him as he begins to develop feelings for the young office worker at his company.
Characters

Episode 10
 – Summary: The Hirooka's front door is mistaken for a garbage drop spot, and when the Boss's wife starts throwing out his favorite things, Ritsuko and Yoshio have to do everything they can to save the tacky items, or risk losing a promotion.
Characters

Manager

Manager's Wife

Ritsuko's Father-in-Law

Episode 11
 – Summary: Shinonome is a downtrodden company man who is going through life without finding true happiness. His junior high school reunion soon rolls around and his thoughts turn to a girl he once loved named Shima.
Characters

Shinonome's Wife

Episode 12
 – Summary: Ryuuichi's mother, Kayoko moves in with her son and his young wife, Hanako. But problems start to arise when Hanako starts behaving oddly and risking the anger of her mother-in-law who they are counting on to invest in their new home. Hanako claims a large spirit is the cause, but only she can see him.
Characters

Young Ryūichi

Episode 13
 – Summary:''' The Kogure's are asked to take care of Mr. Matsurida's dog Gorgeous, but when his mistress moves in and the children draw eyebrows on the dog, things become complicated.
Characters

Mrs. Matsurida

Drama
A two-episode Japanese television drama adaptation was broadcast on NHK-BS Premium. The first episode adapted the "Red Bouquet" "Hidden in the Pottery" and "Aberrant Family F" stories, and the second episode adapted "The Executive's Dog", "Birds of Fate" and "As Long As You Are Here" stories. The first episode premiered on July 8 and the second on July 15, 2012.

See alsoRumic World''

References

External links
Description on Furinkan.com

1994 manga
2003 anime television series debuts
Animation anthology series
Geneon USA
Japanese television dramas based on manga
Manga anthologies
NHK television dramas
Odex
Seinen manga
Shogakukan manga
TMS Entertainment
TV Tokyo original programming
Viz Media manga
Works by Rumiko Takahashi